The Algarve International Circuit, commonly referred to as Portimão Circuit, is a  race circuit located in Portimão, Algarve region, Portugal. The development includes a karting track, off-road track, technology park, five-star hotel, sports complex and apartments.

The circuit was designed by Ricardo Pina, Arquitectos. The construction was finished in October 2008 and the circuit was homologated by both the FIM on 11 October 2008 and the FIA two days later. The total cost was €195 million (approximately $250 million).

The circuit

The circuit hosted the final round of the World Superbike Championship on 2 November 2008. On 9 June, the track was confirmed to host a round of the 2008-09 A1 Grand Prix season. The race was set for the weekend of 12 April 2009. On 10 October 2008, the Le Mans Series announced a 1000 km night race to be held at Algarve on 2 August 2009. On 5 November 2008, the FIA GT Championship announced and 7th round of the 2009 season will be held at Algarve on 13 September 2009. A Formula One test session, with the McLaren and Honda teams participating, was scheduled for 15–17 December 2008. Ferrari also ran at Algarve. Toyota also tested at the circuit on 20 January 2009 in the first outing of their new TF109 chassis. The circuit will also host the final round of the 2009 GP2 Series season in September 2009. From 2010 it hosted a round of the FIA World Touring Car Championship. 

On 4 April 2009 Max Mosley stated that based on the quality of the circuit it could integrate the Formula One championship under the guise of the Portuguese Grand Prix, as long as a commercial agreement with the Formula One Management was achieved. Due to changes to the 2020 Formula One season as a result of the COVID-19 pandemic, the Algarve International Circuit has by way of exception hosted the 2020 Portuguese Grand Prix.

The circuit resembles old Nürburgring and Spa-Francorchamps, mainly because of its constantly undulating nature. A1 Team Portugal's driver Filipe Albuquerque observed that there are big downhill slopes and right-hand turns after the main straight. He also commented that the track is good for overtaking because of the circuit width. A1 Team New Zealand's driver Earl Bamber observed that there are many special turns with personality. He commented that the new circuit is a little bit dangerous like the old school circuits with a roller coaster ride. A1 Team France's driver Nicolas Prost commented that the asphalt was new and the circuit has little grip.

The first episode of The Grand Tour, "The Holy Trinity" was shot here in 2016.

At the 2022 Supersport 300 World Championship, Victor Steeman died causing fatal accident at this circuit while racing in the Race 1 Portimão round.

After COVID-19 pandemic

In July 2020 it was announced that the circuit would host the Formula One Portuguese Grand Prix from 23 to 25 October, as part of a revised calendar arising from the disruption caused by the COVID-19 pandemic. This marked the first time a Portuguese Grand Prix had been held since the 1996 race, which had taken place at the Autódromo do Estoril. The circuit hosted the Portuguese Grand Prix again in 2021 from 30 April to 2 May.

In August 2020 it was announced that the circuit would host the MotoGP Portuguese motorcycle Grand Prix from 20 to 22 November, as part of a revised calendar arising from the disruption caused by the COVID-19 pandemic. On 10 August 2020, MotoGP announced that the coronavirus-hit season would end with the Portuguese Grand Prix in Portimão. The circuit hosted the Portuguese motor cycle Grand Prix again in 2021 from 16 to 18 April, and hosted a second event named the Algarve Grand Prix from 5 to 7 November.

In January 2021 it was announced that the circuit would host the FIA World Endurance Championship 8 Hours of Portimão instead of 1000 Miles of Sebring on 4 April due to the disruption caused by the COVID-19 pandemic. However, on 5 March 2021; the round was postponed into the original date of 2021 24 Hours of Le Mans, 13 June in order to increase the possibility of fans being able to attend the race. 

For 2022, it was planned that the circuit would not host F1 and WEC races, but it would continue to host MotoGP, World SBK, and ELMS races. Besides them, it would host DTM, TCR Europe and Lamborghini Super Trofeo World Final for the first time in 2022. In September 2022, it was announced that the circuit returned to the 2023 WEC calendar.

Craig Jones memorial
The circuit is the site of a statue in tribute to Craig Jones, representing Jones on his motorbike after passing the finishing line. This statue will be the main part of a monument, already partially built, which also includes the architectural arrangement of the main access roundabout to the racetrack, created by Paula Hespanha and Portuguese architect Manuel Pedro Ferreira Chaves.
This monument is a landscape sculpture, representing the main straight of a racing circuit, which extends up to the car park of the main grandstand. It has been confirmed that one of the corners of the circuit was named after former World Supersport rider Craig Jones who was killed in a motorcycle crash at Brands Hatch in 2008.

Layout configurations

Events

 Current

 February: Porsche Sprint Challenge Southern Europe
 March: Grand Prix motorcycle racing Portuguese motorcycle Grand Prix, 
 April: FIA World Endurance Championship 6 Hours of Portimão, International GT Open, Euroformula Open Championship, TCR Europe Touring Car Series
 May: SuperCars Endurance Series Algarve Welcome Spring, Campeonato de España de Resistencia
 July: GT2 European Series, British GT Championship, FIM CEV Moto3 Junior World Championship, FIM CEV Moto2 European Championship
 October: Superbike World Championship, European Le Mans Series 4 Hours of Portimão, Le Mans Cup, Ligier European Series, FIA Masters Historic Formula One Championship Algarve Classic Festival

 Former

 24H Series 24 Hours of Portimão (2017–2020, 2022)
 A1 Grand Prix (2009)
 Alpine Elf Europa Cup (2020–2021)
 Auto GP (2009, 2012)
 British Formula 3 International Series (2009)
 EuroBOSS Series (2009)
 Deutsche Tourenwagen Masters (2022)
 Formula One Portuguese Grand Prix (2020–2021)
 F4 Spanish Championship (2016, 2018–2019, 2021–2022)
 FIA Formula 3 European Championship (2015)
 FIA GT Championship Algarve 2 Hours (2009)
 FIA GT1 World Championship (2010–2012)
 FIM Endurance World Championship 12 Hours of Portimão (2016)
 GP2 Series Algarve GP2 Series round (2009)
 Grand Prix motorcycle racing Algarve motorcycle Grand Prix (2021)
 GT World Challenge Europe (2014–2015)
 Lamborghini Super Trofeo World Final (2022)
 Porsche Cup Brasil (2012–2013)
 TCR International Series (2015)
 World Series Formula V8 3.5 (2009)
 World Touring Car Championship FIA WTCC Race of Portugal (2010, 2012)

Lap records

The fastest official race lap records at the Algarve International Circuit are listed as:

Notes

References

External links

 
 Track maps and history at RacingCircuits.info
 3D preview of the Craig Jones Memorial, partially built, in the main access of the Algarve Motor Park - YouTube 
 “Craig Jones remembered with statue honor” in Algarve resident (30 October 2009) 
 “Craig Jones memorial removed” in Algarve resident (5 November 2009)  
  ”Paula Hespanha expõe estátua de Craig Jones” in Jornal Hardmusica (October 2009) 
  “Memorial Craig Jones em Portimão” in Atrox Mobilis – Motos e Mobilidade (22 October 2009) (contains a 3D preview of the Craig Jones Memorial) 

Sports venues completed in 2008
Motorsport venues in Portugal
A1 Grand Prix circuits
Superbike World Championship circuits
Buildings and structures in Portimão
2008 establishments in Portugal
Sport in Portimão
Tourist attractions in the Algarve
World Touring Car Championship circuits
Formula One circuits
Grand Prix motorcycle circuits